Aujas Cybersecurity Limited formerly known as Aujas Networks Private Limited is a global IT risk management (IRM) company with a presence in United States, South Asia and the Middle East. Aujas offers IRM services which span strategy and advisory, control integration & sustenance and optimisation. The Aujas service portfolio includes services like Information Risk Advisory, Secure Development Life-cycle, Identity & Access Management, Data Protection and Privacy Services.

Aujas was founded in 2008 by Rao, along with Navin Kotian (CMO) and Sameer Shelke (COO). The company was incubated by IDG Ventures as part of its Entrepreneur-in-Residence (EIR) programme, and had also received seed funding from IDG. Aujas has offices in Bangalore, Mumbai and Delhi-NCR in India; New Jersey and California in the US, and an office in Sharjah (UAE).

Background

Prior to setting up Aujas, Rao was a director at Cisco. In the past, he had worked at companies like Network Solutions, Microland and Sonata Software. He is currently an independent director at 24x7 Learning Pvt Ltd. Kotian was Country Business Manager at IBM Global Services prior to co-founding Aujas, and has also served as the Business manager at Network Solutions India. The other co-founder Shelke was director (service development & solutions) at Fidelity Investments, and had also worked at Cisco, HP and Microland.

Funding

The company raised an undisclosed round of funding from a consortium of venture capital investors, led by Rajasthan Venture Capital Fund, IvyCap Ventures and IDG Ventures India. Proceeds from the Series B round of funding will be used by the company to invest in technology, as well as strengthen its presence in North America, South Asia and in the Middle East. Earlier in 2008, it had received a funding of $3 million from IDG Ventures India.

Acquisition 
In 2019, NSEIT, the IT-services focused subsidiary of the National Stock Exchange has acquired Aujas.

Industry Ranking
In 2013, Aujas was ranked Number 26 on the Deloitte Technology Fast 50 India 2013 organised by Deloitte Touche Tohmatsu India Private Limited, a ranking of the 50 fastest growing technology companies in India. It has achieved the CERT-In (Indian Computer Emergency Response Team) empanelment as an IT Security Audit Organisation.

References

Risk management companies
Companies based in Bangalore
Indian companies established in 2008
2008 establishments in Karnataka